The arrondissement of La Roche-sur-Yon is an arrondissement of France in the Vendée department in the Pays de la Loire region. It has 77 communes.

Composition

The communes of the arrondissement of La Roche-sur-Yon, and their INSEE codes, are:

 Aizenay (85003)
 Apremont (85006)
 Aubigny-Les Clouzeaux (85008)
 Bazoges-en-Paillers (85013)
 Beaufou (85015)
 Beaurepaire (85017)
 Bellevigny (85019)
 La Bernardière (85021)
 La Boissière-de-Montaigu (85025)
 Bournezeau (85034)
 Les Brouzils (85038)
 La Bruffière (85039)
 La Chaize-le-Vicomte (85046)
 Chantonnay (85051)
 Chanverrie (85302)
 La Chapelle-Palluau (85055)
 Chauché (85064)
 Chavagnes-en-Paillers (85065)
 La Copechagnière (85072)
 Cugand (85076)
 Dompierre-sur-Yon (85081)
 Les Epesses (85082)
 Essarts-en-Bocage (85084)
 Falleron (85086)
 La Ferrière (85089)
 Fougeré (85093)
 La Gaubretière (85097)
 La Genétouze (85098)
 Grand'Landes (85102)
 L'Herbergement (85108)
 Les Herbiers (85109)
 Landeronde (85118)
 Les Landes-Genusson (85119)
 Les Lucs-sur-Boulogne (85129)
 Maché (85130)
 Mallièvre (85134)
 La Merlatière (85142)
 Mesnard-la-Barotière (85144)
 Montaigu-Vendée (85146)
 Montréverd (85197)
 Mortagne-sur-Sèvre (85151)
 Mouchamps (85153)
 Mouilleron-le-Captif (85155)
 Nesmy (85160)
 Palluau (85169)
 Le Poiré-sur-Vie (85178)
 La Rabatelière (85186)
 Rives de l'Yon (85213)
 Rocheservière (85190)
 La Roche-sur-Yon (85191)
 Rochetrejoux (85192)
 Saint-André-Goule-d'Oie (85196)
 Saint-Aubin-des-Ormeaux (85198)
 Saint-Denis-la-Chevasse (85208)
 Sainte-Cécile (85202)
 Saint-Étienne-du-Bois (85210)
 Saint-Fulgent (85215)
 Saint-Germain-de-Prinçay (85220)
 Saint-Hilaire-le-Vouhis (85232)
 Saint-Laurent-sur-Sèvre (85238)
 Saint-Malô-du-Bois (85240)
 Saint-Mars-la-Réorthe (85242)
 Saint-Martin-des-Noyers (85246)
 Saint-Martin-des-Tilleuls (85247)
 Saint-Paul-en-Pareds (85259)
 Saint-Paul-Mont-Penit (85260)
 Saint-Philbert-de-Bouaine (85262)
 Saint-Prouant (85266)
 Saint-Vincent-Sterlanges (85276)
 Sigournais (85282)
 Le Tablier (85285)
 Thorigny (85291)
 Tiffauges (85293)
 Treize-Septiers (85295)
 Treize-Vents (85296)
 Venansault (85300)
 Vendrennes (85301)

History

The arrondissement of La Roche-sur-Yon was created in 1804. At the January 2017 reorganisation of the arrondissements of Vendée, it received eight communes from the arrondissement of Les Sables-d'Olonne, and it lost 11 communes to the arrondissement of Fontenay-le-Comte. In January 2019 the commune Landeronde passed from the arrondissement of Les Sables-d'Olonne to the arrondissement of La Roche-sur-Yon.

As a result of the reorganisation of the cantons of France which came into effect in 2015, the borders of the cantons are no longer related to the borders of the arrondissements. The cantons of the arrondissement of La Roche-sur-Yon were, as of January 2015:

 Chantonnay
 Les Essarts
 Les Herbiers
 Mareuil-sur-Lay-Dissais
 Montaigu
 Mortagne-sur-Sèvre
 Le Poiré-sur-Vie
 Rocheservière
 La Roche-sur-Yon-Nord
 La Roche-sur-Yon-Sud
 Saint-Fulgent

References

La Roche-sur-Yon